USS Reliable (SP-352) was a boat or ship which the United States Navy at least considered for service during World War I. Although she received the section patrol number 352, no record of her characteristics or service have been found.

References
 NavSource Online: Section Patrol Craft (SP) and Civilian Vessels (ID) Index

Patrol vessels of the United States Navy
World War I patrol vessels of the United States